Arcanumophis is a genus of snake in the family Colubridae  that contains the sole species Arcanumophis problematicus. the problem ground snake. It is found in Peru. This species was previously placed in the genus Erythrolamprus.

References 

Dipsadinae
Monotypic snake genera
Reptiles of Peru
Reptiles described in 1986